Qistibi is a popular traditional dish in Tatarstan, Bashkortostan and Chuvashia. Qistibi is roasted flatbreads with various fillings inside. The dough should be unleavened. The most popular filling is mashed potato but it may also be ragout or millet. The filling is placed on one half of the flat cake and is covered by the other half. Later, clarified butter is spread on the flat cakes.

See also
 Çiberek
 Gözleme
 List of Russian dishes
 List of stuffed dishes
 Peremech
 Puran poli

References
 My Home - Tatar cuisine. Recipes with a photo.

Flatbread dishes
Bashkir cuisine
Tatar cuisine
Stuffed dishes